TMEM128, also known as Transmembrane Protein 128, is a protein that in humans is encoded by the TMEM128 gene. TMEM128 has three variants, varying in 5' UTR's and start codon location. TMEM128 contains four transmembrane domains and is localized in the Endoplasmic Reticulum membrane. TMEM128 contains a variety of regulation at the gene, transcript, and protein level. While the function of TMEM128 is poorly understood, it interacts with several proteins associated with the cell cycle, signal transduction, and memory.

Gene 
The TMEM128, or transmembrane protein 128, gene in humans is located on the minus strand at 4p16.3. TMEM128 contains 5 exons total and is 12,701 base pairs long including introns.

Transcripts 
There are two isoforms of TMEM128. Isoform 1 being the longest, consists of two variants differing in the 3' UTR region.  Variant 1 mRNA is 1,243 base pairs long while Variant 2 mRNA is 1,241 base pairs long. Isoform 2 differs in the 5' UTR region of the protein and uses a different start codon location compared to the first variant. This variant is longer at 1,785 base pairs and has a different N-terminus.

Neighboring genes 
TMEM128 is neighbored upstream by LYAR, Ly1 antibody reactive, and downstream by OTOP1, Otopetrin 1.

Protein

Isoform 1 
TMEM128 Isoform 1 translates into a protein of 165 amino acids long, containing four transmembrane domains. These domains exist at amino acids 49-69, 81-101, 119-139, and 144-164. Isoform 1 is18,882 Da and has a pI of 6.27. Using compositional analysis, the amino acid composition is similar to the average protein and there are no significant repeats in the protein.

Isoform 2 
Isoform 2 translates into a protein of 141 amino acids long, also containing four transmembrane domains. Isoform 2 has a different molecular weight and isoelectric point compared to Isoform 1, coming in at 16,093 Da and having a pI of 6.8.

Secondary structure 

Predicted secondary structure composition shows that most of the secondary structure consists of random coils. No disulfide bonds are predicted to be present.

Membrane topology of TMEM128 shows the four transmembrane domains, longer N-terminus, and shorter C terminus.

Tertiary structure 

Tertiary structure is predicted to have four spiral domains in TMEM128. These domains are the transmembrane sections of the protein.  For the above models, it is colored rainbow from N-terminus to C-terminus.

Regulation of expression

Gene level regulation 

Several promotors/enhancers of TMEM128 exist, with the GH04J00427 promotor located near the start of transcription, the GH04J004540 enhancer located downstream, and GH04J004264 enhancer located upstream of their target gene. TMEM128 sequence also contains many binding sites for various transcription factors, including TATA box, CCAAT binding protein, and cAMP-responsive element binding protein.

Expression of TMEM128 is also regulated at the gene level through differential tissue expression as seen with the image to the left. Red bars represent absolute expression while blue dots represent relative expression. TMEM128 is expressed highly in areas such as the adrenal gland and spinal cord, while is lower in areas such as the liver and bone marrow.

Transcript level regulation 

Several miRNAs have binding sites on the 3' UTR of TMEM128 including:

 hsa-miR-300
 hsa-miR-188-5p
 hsa-miR-506-3p
 hsa-miR-3163
 hsa-miR-548t-5p
 hsa-miR-3163
 hsa-miR-548t-5p
 hsa-miR-548az-5p

These miRNAs can participate in RNA silencing to prevent the expression of the mRNA.

Analyses of mouse brains show lack of region-specific expression throughout.

Protein level regulation 
In terms of protein regulation, TMEM128 contains many different post-translational domains including glycation, phosphorylation, SUMOylation, and O-GlcNAc as seen below:

Post-translational modification alters protein structure and can thus alter protein function and viability.

Sub-cellular localization 
TMEM128 was found to be located in the Endoplasmic Reticulum membrane, with the N-terminus and C-terminus facing into the cytoplasm.

Evolution

Paralogs 
There are no known paralogs of TMEM128.

Orthologs 
Orthologs of TMEM128 have not been found outside of Eukaryotes. Inside of Eukaryotes, TMEM128 orthologs have been found in mammals, birds, and several fungi. Mammals contained the highest amount of conservation at no less than 71% conservation. The most distant ortholog detected was the Diversispora epigaea, a fungus. The transmembrane domains of this protein remain the most conserved throughout species, with key amino acids Trp51, Trp139, and Trp142 being conserved in all species with orthologous proteins. All information below was obtained through NCBI BLAST.

Mutation rate 
The evolution rate is at a medium pace, slower than the fibrinogen alpha chain but faster than cytochrome c, suggesting neither positive or negative selection at this locus.

Interacting proteins 
TMEM128 has been found via yeast two-hybrid assays to interact with:

Arc/Arg 3.1, also known as Activity-regulated cytoskeleton-associated protein, which helps facilitate learning and memory processes
GRB2, also known as Growth factor receptor-bound protein 2, which is involved in cell development and signal transduction.
BCL2L13, also known as B-cell lymphoma 2-like 13, which is an apoptosis facilitator
CLN8, also known as Ceroid-lipofuscinosis neuronal 8, which acts as a receptor in the Golgi and Endoplasmic Reticulum.
RABAC1, also known as Prenylated Rab acceptor 1, which assists in vesicle transport.
TMPRSS2, also known as Transmembrane protease, serine 2, which has a poorly understood function.
GJB5, also known as Gap junction beta-5 protein or connexin-31.1, which functions as a gap junction.

Function 
The biological function of TMEM128 is still poorly understood. As this is a transmembrane protein, common functions may include receptors, channels, or anchorage. Because TMEM128 has post-translational modification sites, alternative protein states may be present that permit TMEM128 to have different forms. For example, phosphorylation of TMEM128 may make it bind to different substrates through conformational change. TMEM128 also has a variety of interactions with other proteins as discussed above, suggesting it may have a broad range of action.

Clinical significance

Cancer 
TMEM128 has been found to show moderate to strong positivity in some patients with carcinoma, with other types of cancer such as melanoma, glioma, breast, ovarian, renal, and pancreatic showing weak to moderate positivity. TMEM128 also has been found to show low cancer specificity.

Skeletal muscle 
TMEM128 expression is experimentally associated with presence of the ROR alpha1 protein, as TMEM128 was found in lower quantities when ROR alpha1 was deleted.

Skin 
TMEM128 expression was lowered following a null mutation of TAp63 in skin cells.

Cardiac muscle 
TMEM128 expression was increased following a Trypanosoma cruzi infection.

Neurological diseases 
While it has been associated with several diseases such as Wolf-Hirschhorn Syndrome, no evidence exists for the exact cause of this syndrome and may only be correlation because of location on chromosome 4

Mutations 
Several SNPs have been found in association with TMEM128:

References 

Transmembrane proteins